The economic biomass potential of Turkey is 32 Mtoe/year. The total biomass production is estimated to reach 52.5 Mtoe by 2030.Arable crops in Central Anatolia and the Mediterranean have the most potential for electricity, and in 2021 biomass generated 7.6 TWh, which was 2.3% of the nation's electricity, from over 2 GW capacity. Tupraş intends to make sustainable aviation fuel. An estimated 6.5 million homes in Turkey use biomass as their main source of heating fuel.

Potential Utilization of Bioenergy in Turkey 
Renewable energy in Turkey is considerably high and can contribute to the total energy network within the country. After coal, Turkey's renewable energy sources are the second largest source for energy production. Biomass makes up about two thirds of the renewable energy produced. Sources of biomass energy include grain dust, wheat straw, and hazelnut shell. Biomass as an energy source is advantageous due to its ability to be readily available all year round. Biomass energy is expected to dominate Turkey's energy supply due to its potential cost-effectiveness and sustainability.

Biogas
There is significant biogas generation potential in Turkey. More than eighty five million tons of animal waste is produced annually in Turkey. This could be used to produce over 1.8 million tons of oil equivalent (toe). With plant waste included the potential raises to over 5.3 million tons of oil equivalent (toe). However, only 85 biogas facilities with 36 plants are currently in operation in Turkey.

Landfill power is in operation and under construction, including the European side of Istanbul.

Biofuel
One percent of fuel requirements in Turkey are produced by biofuels, with an estimated increase of seven percent in 2023.

Biojet production is hoped to be certified in 2022.  A biodiesel plant is planned.

Bioethanol
In 2011, Turkish Energy Regulatory Agency (EMRA) mandated biofuel blending for bioethanol (2%) and biodiesel (1%). Approximately 1.5 million tons of biodiesel and 3 million tons of bioethanol are produced in Turkey. Sugar beets are the main source of bioethanol production in Turkey, followed by corn and wheat, with a yearly production of 15, 4.3 and 20 tons per year, respectively.

Biomass Barriers in Turkey 
There are drawbacks to using biomass as energy in Turkey. These include but are not limited to: availability (seasonally and geographically), production (based on climate conditions), and cost of transportation. Overall, the cost of biomass waste varies depending on Turkey's economic status and crop production.  there are no reliable production or export statistics.

See also 

 Renewable energy in Turkey
 Solar power in Turkey
 Wind power in Turkey
 Geothermal power in Turkey
 Hydroelectricity in Turkey
 Renewable energy by country

References

Energy in Turkey
Bioenergy